The San Jose Y Las Animas is a shipwreck with historical significance near Plantation Key, Florida, United States. It sank in a hurricane in 1733 and is located approximately 4 miles southeast of Plantation Key. On March 18, 1975, it was added to the U.S. National Register of Historic Places.

References

National Register of Historic Places in Monroe County, Florida
Shipwrecks of the Florida Keys
Shipwrecks on the National Register of Historic Places in Florida
Shipwrecks on the National Register of Historic Places
Maritime incidents in 1733